The Gross Bielenhorn is a mountain in the Urner Alps.

Mountains of the Alps
Alpine three-thousanders
Mountains of the canton of Uri
Mountains of Switzerland